The Swiss Class B 3/4 locomotives were built between 1905 and 1916 for the Swiss Federal Railways. In total 69 2-6-0 locomotives of this type were built, and numbered 1301–1369.

After the Second World War, the NS urgently needed equipment, the series SBB B 3/4 of the SBB was out of service. The NS bought 5 steam locomotives,
the 1096, 1172, 1530, 1629 and 1767 at NS they got the numbers 3001, 3002, 3003, 3004, 3005.

Preservation 

One locomotive of this type has been preserved. This is Number 1367, built in 1916.

See also
 List of stock used by Swiss Federal Railways

References

2-6-0 locomotives
B 3 4
Steam locomotives of Switzerland
Preserved steam locomotives of Switzerland
SLM locomotives
Standard gauge locomotives of Switzerland
1′C n3v locomotives
1′C h2 locomotives